WODR-LD, virtual and UHF digital channel 19, was a low-powered Cozi TV-affiliated television station licensed to Wausau, Wisconsin, United States. The station was owned by the DTV America subsidiary of HC2 Holdings.

History 
The station’s construction permit was initially issued on February 22, 2011 under the calls of W19DR-D. It was changed to WODR-LD callsign.

The station is no longer on air and it's Broadcast License was cancelled in October, 2020

Digital channel

References

External links
DTV America 

Low-power television stations in the United States
Innovate Corp.
ODR-LD
Television channels and stations established in 2011
2011 establishments in Wisconsin